Love and Other Planets is the second album by British singer/songwriter Adem Ilhan, who records under the name Adem. According to Ilham, the album itself is a loose concept album about "space. And cosmic things. And people."

Track listing

References

Adem Ilhan albums
Domino Recording Company albums
2006 albums